Chrást is a municipality and village in Příbram District in the Central Bohemian Region of the Czech Republic. It has about 200 inhabitants.

Administrative parts
Villages of Lisovice, Namnice and Oslí are administrative parts of Chrást.

References

Villages in Příbram District